Cephalozia catenulata is a species of liverwort belonging to the family Cephaloziaceae.

It is native to Eurasia and Northern America.

It has cosmopolitan distribution.

References

Cephaloziaceae